The 2017–18 NorthEast United FC season was the club's fourth season since its establishment in 2014 and their fourth season in the Indian Super League.

Squad

Current squad

Players
Players and squad numbers last updated on 6 March 2018.
Note: Flags indicate national team as has been defined under FIFA eligibility rules. Players may hold more than one non-FIFA nationality.

Background

2016 was another disappointing season for NorthEast United. NorthEast United started their campaign on a high note with two consecutive wins over Kerala Blasters and Goa. By mid-season NorthEast United lost all the momentum and had longest winless run of 5 matches (shared with Pune City and Chennaiyin) and longest losing run of 4 matches. By the end of season NorthEast United came very close to qualifying for knockout phase. In their final match of regular league phase NorthEast United needed a win against Kerala Blasters to proceed further, which they ended up losing 1–0 by conceding a goal at 66th minute. NorthEast United finished 5th on points table with 18 points from 14 matches. After the end of season, NorthEast United parted ways with coach Nelo Vingada on mutual consent.

Transfers

At the end of 2016 Indian Super League season majority of domestic players from NorthEast United were loaned by or transferred to I-League clubs for 2016–17 season. After I-League season all loaned out players returned to club. However, due to the Indian Super League regulation each club was allowed to retain a maximum of two Indian players over the age of twenty-one (21) from previous squad.

NorthEast United announced on 17 July 2017 that João Carlos Pires de Deus will be taking over as head coach. Deus said:

On 8 July, NorthEast United announced they are retaining Rehenesh TP and Rowllin Borges for two years. Remaining players from previous squad who had returned from loans namely Nirmal Chettri, Reagan Singh, Fanai Lalrempuia, Subrata Pal, Seityasen Singh, Robin Gurung and Sumeet Passi went straight into players draft.

In ISL draft held on 23 July 2017, NorthEast United retained defenders Nirmal Chettri and Reagan Singh and midfielder Fanai Lalrempuia. NorthEast United added eight new players from draft, goalkeepers Ravi Kumar and Gurpreet Singh Chabhal, defenders Robert Lalthlamuana, Gursimrat Singh Gill and Abdul Hakku, midfielders Lalrindika Ralte, Malemngamba Meitei and Sushil Meitei. Forward Seminlen Doungel made his come back to NorthEast United for a second stint along with forward Halicharan Narzary.

In ISL draft, goalkeeper Subrata Pal, defender Robin Gurung and forward Sumeet Passi drafted to new expansion franchise Jamshedpur FC. Midfielder Seityasen Singh was picked by Delhi Dynamos.

On 13 September, NorthEast United announced their eight foreign singing namely defenders Martín Díaz, Sambinha and José Gonçalves, midfielders Adilson and Marcinho and forwards Luis Páez, Odaïr Fortes and Wellington da Silva on their official Twitter account from series of Tweets.

Wellington da Silva was later replaced by forward Danilo for unknown reasons.

Loan return and players draft

In

n1. Player was retained by club before draft.
n2. Player was part of club's previous season squad but had to enter players draft due to the Indian Super League regulation.

Pre-season and friendlies
NorthEast United began their pre-season training on 27 September. Squad gather in Imphal on 17 October for 10-day pre-season training camp where they played an exhibition match against NEROCA which ended as 2–0 in favor of NorthEast United.

After training in Imphal, club went to Antalya, Turkey for the final leg of the pre-season. In Turkey, NorthEast United played friendly matches against Iraqi top division sides Al-Kahraba FC, Al-Naft SC, Naft Al-Janoob SC, Al-Najaf FC and Turkish top division side Alanyaspor.

Indian Super League

Results summary

Results by round

Matches

Indian Super Cup

Announced on 15 March 2018, 2018 Indian Super Cup is a replacement for the Federation Cup. The qualifiers for the inaugural tournament are to begin on 15 March and conclude on 31 March 2018. The tournament proper will then commence on 5 April and conclude with the final on 25 April 2018.

NorthEast, having finished the 2017–18 ISL at the bottom spot, had to play the qualifiers to enter the competition. They played their qualifier match against Gokulam Kerala on 15 Match 2018 at the Kalinga Stadium in Bhubaneswar which they lost 0-2.

Foreign Players

Indian Super Cup, unlike Indian Super League, allows only 6 foreign players in squad for the tournament. Out of the 6 players 5 can be fielded by the teams.

Qualifiers

Management
Updated 12 January 2018.

Squad statistics

Appearances and goals

|-
|colspan="14"|Players who left NorthEast United during the season:

|}

Goal scorers

Disciplinary record

References

NorthEast United FC seasons
NorthEast